Christian Howard (born 19 March 1991) is an Australian rules footballer who played for the  in the Australian Football League.

Originally from Adelaide, South Australia, Howard was drafted to the Bulldogs from the Glenelg Football Club in the SANFL with their first selection, the 15th overall in the 2009 AFL Draft. Howard was a surprise selection for the Bulldogs in the draft, with many predicting he would not be drafted until at least the third round.

Seen as a potential long-term replacement for Lindsay Gilbee, Howard missed a large part of his first season with a hip injury and could not force his way into the senior lineup.

Howard was delisted at the conclusion of the 2014 AFL season.

References

External links

1991 births
Living people
Australian rules footballers from South Australia
Western Bulldogs players
Williamstown Football Club players
People educated at Sacred Heart College, Adelaide